Jason Manuel Olazabal (born October 14, 1973), also just known as Jason Olazabal, is an American actor, known for playing Ramon Prado in Showtime TV series, Dexter.

Life and career
Olazábal was born in Santa Maria, California. His acting career started in 2001 in Law & Order. He then appeared in The Education of Max Bickford in 2002 and Bad Boys II in 2003 as Detective Marco Vargas. Along with Law & Order, he has starred in Law & Order: Special Victims Unit and Law & Order: Criminal Intent. In 2006, he starred in Charmed and Inside Man. He appeared in House and Numb3rs in 2007. In Season 3 of Dexter, he starred as Ramon Prado in 9 episodes as a lieutenant, grieving over the loss of his brother, and later in the season, his other brother. He jointly received a Screen Actors Guild Award nomination for "Outstanding Performance by an Ensemble in a Drama Series", along with other Dexter co-stars. He appeared in The Unit in 2009 and became a recurring character in Make It or Break It as Alex Cruz.

He married actress Sunita Param on February 6, 2004. Jason Manuel Olazabal is also a member of Iota Phi Theta fraternity, initiated at the Fraternity's Beta Sigma Chapter (U. of Northern Colorado) in 1994.

Filmography

References

External links
 

1973 births
Living people
American male film actors
American male television actors
People from Santa Maria, California
21st-century American male actors